Isia may refer to:

Isia (moth), a genus of moths in the subfamily Arctiinae
 isiA, a photosynthetic protein
International Ski Instructors Association
Istituto Superiore per le Industrie Artistiche, four Italian universities which train students in design

See also
Isaiah (disambiguation)